Jean-Marie van Staveren (born 21 March 1946, in Rotterdam) is a Dutch painter and art teacher.

Biography 
She studied at Art Academy Amersfoort, and Utrecht School of the Arts, first grade drawing and art history, from 1979 to 1984, She graduated from Utrecht University in Art History and Archaeology in 1993. She was a teacher at School of the Arts from 1986 - 2010. She lives and works in Spain (Callosa d'en Sarrià) and the Netherlands (Soesterberg).

Work
Her work is both abstract and figurative. Sources of inspiration are the landscape and human. Her paintings are characterized by sincere direct rawness. The abstracted figurative work shows the many sides that life offers. The works are mostly executed in mixed media or oil/acrylics.

She is an admirer of the work of Lucian Freud and Francis Bacon and sometimes makes paintings with the same subject or variations. Her work fits between abstract expressionism and the Cobra movement of the two currents that dominated art world after World War II. Her work is characterized by using tertiary colors and bright colors. Topics include figurative, imaginary portraits and abstract landscapes.

Her work has won public tenders, in corporate collections and private collections. Her work was exhibited in Madrid during the Premio Pentura. In 2000, van Staveren nominated for the art prize 2000 by the Internet platform ArtOlive for lending and selling art.

Honours and awards
In 1986 she received the BJ Kerkhof Prize for her entire oeuvre. In 1999 she received the Boellaard Prize of the Society Kunstliefde Utrecht.

Exhibitions 
In 1994, she had her first solo exhibition in the Society Kunstliefde in Utrecht. Group and solo exhibitions include:
Gallerie de Witt Dordrecht / The Hague Facette Gallery / House of Fine Arts Utrecht / NBr With Art Centre / Gallery Hüstegge Bosch / Amsterdam Gallery of the Sower / Choix 1997 Amsterdam / Groeneveld Castle Baarn / Gallery Ecco''Hazel Gay "/ Premio The Pintura Madrid Spain / The Arts Company in Heemstede / Dorwerth Castle / The Canals Soest

Fundación Cultural Knecht-Drenth
van Staveren is Chairman of the Fundación Cultural Knecht-Drenth Callosa d'En Sarria (Alicante) Spain since 2008.

Knecht-Drenth Cultural Foundation was founded in 1996 by Mrs Knecht-Drenth. Tijmen (died 2010) and Helen Knecht Knecht-Drenth years were already engaged in collecting art. Five of their collections: Dutch paintings, European graphics, Dutch glass, traditional Spanish pottery and Chinese porcelain, was donated by the founders of museums in Spain, Germany and the Netherlands. With the establishment of the Foundation Knecht-Drenth couple aims to encourage artistic initiatives. The FCKD does so at a reduced contribution temporary living / workspace / studios available in Dutch and Flemish artists, writers, translators and scholars, in Callosa d'En Sarrià in Alicante Spain

Artist in residence 
The foundation has five residential work studios in Callosa d'En Sarrià designed for Dutch and Flemish artists, designers, scientists, writers, translators, and musicians. The FCKD is a volunteer organization that aims to bring its guests closer to Spain - its culture and nature. In the four decades of contacts with Spain and Latin America, the founders of the Dutch experience that too few of the very rich Spanish culture and art and its dissemination, fail. Fundación Cultural Knecht-Drenth is a foundation under Spanish law.

References

External links
 Jean-Marie van Staveren website
 blog
 Annex Gallery
 Antiek Kunst
 Fundación Cultural Knecht-Drenth
 Society Kunstliefde
 ArtOlive

1946 births
Dutch artists
Artists from Rotterdam
Living people